Denis Pätoprstý (born November 5, 1997) is a Slovak professional ice hockey right winger for HK Nitra of the Tipos Extraliga.

Pätoprstý was previously an academy player at HC Topoľčany, MHC Martin and BK Mladá Boleslav before joining HC Slovan Bratislava of the Kontinental Hockey League. He played six games for the team during the 2016–17 KHL season and scored no points before returning to Slovakia with Team Slovakia U20 as well as a return to HC Topoľčany. 

In 2018, Pätoprstý signed for Tipsport Liga side HK Nitra.

References

External links

 

1997 births
Living people
HK Nitra players
Sportspeople from Topoľčany
Slovak ice hockey right wingers
HC Slovan Bratislava players
HK Trnava players
Slovak expatriate ice hockey players in the Czech Republic